Aashram (English: Hermitage) is an Indian Hindi-language crime drama web series directed by Prakash Jha for MX Player original. It is produced by Prakash Jha under Prakash Jha Productions. The series stars Bobby Deol along with Aaditi Pohankar, Darshan Kumar, Chandan Roy Sanyal, Tushar Pandey, Anupriya Goenka, Adhyayan Suman, Vikram Kochhar, Tridha Choudhury, Rajeev Siddhartha, Sachin Shroff, Anurita Jha, Parinitaa Seth, Jahangir Khan, Azhar Mirza ,Kanupriya Gupta, Preeti Sood,Navdeep Tomar and Ayaan Aditya,  in key roles. It is written by Madhvi Bhatt, Avinash Kumar, Sanjay Masoomm, Tejpal Singh Rawat and Kuldeep Ruhil. Its first season was made available for streaming on OTT platform MX Player for free from 28 August 2020.

The second season of the series was released on MX Player on 11 November 2020, with the third season following in June 2022, respectively. The series has been renewed for a fourth season in 2023.

Summary

The story revolves around a godman, Baba Nirala (Bobby Deol), whose followers (mostly from the disadvantaged sections of the society) have blind faith in him and will do anything that he asks of them. In reality, he is a conman who ensures that his devotees devote their wealth to him and stay attached to his ashram for life. Politicians Hukum Singh (Sachin Shroff) and incumbent CM Sundar Lal (Anil Rastogi) vie for Baba Nirala's support in the upcoming State Legislative Assembly Elections owing to his large number of followers for their vote bank politics, which only increase after a pop singer, Tinka Singh (Adhyayan Suman) decides to conduct tours with Baba Nirala to promote his new song.

Meanwhile, SI Ujagar Singh (Darshan Kumar) is a police officer who has little interest in his job and simply follows his seniors' orders, until he meets Dr. Natasha (Anupriya Goenka) in a case related to a skeleton found on the property of an industrial group which has good ties with Sundar Lal. Her constant pestering, along with the stubbornness of a small-time journalist Akhivendra Rathi alias Akki (Rajeev Siddhartha) encourages him to take up this case, along with his assistant senior constable Sadhu Sharma (Vikram Kocchar).

Cast 
 Bobby Deol as Kashipur Waale Baba Nirala / Monty Singh
 Chandan Roy Sanyal as Bhupendra “Bhopa Swami” Singh
 Aaditi Pohankar as Parminder “Pammi” Lochan
 Tushar Pandey as Satwinder “Satti” Lochan
 Darshan Kumar as Sub-Inspector Ujagar Singh
 Anupriya Goenka as Dr. Natasha Katariya
 Tridha Choudhury as Babita 
 Vikram Kochhar as Senior Constable Sadhu Sharma
 Anil Rastogi as Ex - CM Sundar Lal
 Sachin Shroff as Chief Minister Hukum Singh 
 Anurita Jha as Kavita 
 Rajeev Siddhartha as Akhivendra “Akki” Rathi
 Jahangir Khan as Michael Rathi, Monty's henchman
 Adhyayan Suman as Tinka Singh, a famous pop singer
 Keshav Pandit as Kavita's father
 Mala Sinha as Kavita's mother
 Navdeep Tomar as Sunny, Monty's henchman
Azhar Mirza as Ghaba
 Preeti Singh as Sangeeta 
 Ayaan Aditya as Ravindra Rawat alias RR
 Esha Gupta as Sonia, Hukum Singh's Beau and international brand building expert
 Hemant Choudhary as I.G. Sumit Chauhan

Series overview

Episodes

Season 1 (2020)

Season 2 (2020)

Season 3 (2022)

Marketing and release

Promotion 
The official trailer of the two seasons of this web series was launched on August 16, 2020 and October 29, 2020 respectively by MX Player on YouTube.

Release 
Season 1 and Season 2 was made available for streaming from August 28, 2020 and  November 11, 2020 respectively on OTT Platform MX Player.
The series made its TV debut through The Q on  October 11, 2021.

Critical reception
Writing for NDTV, Saibal Chatterjee rated the series 3 out of 5 adding that “Prakash Jha's digital debut is ambitious, provocative and action-packed.” He praised the performances of actors and concept handling from the director Prakash Jha. Rohan Nahaar of Hindustan Times wrote that Aashram is “a show that doesn’t have the courage of its convictions. The self-censorship of sex scenes is emblematic of the trepidation with which Jha approaches the story. As it turns out, that ridiculous disclaimer was utterly unnecessary.”

Controversies
In December 2020, Jodhpur Court had served a legal notice to Bobby Deol and director Prakash Jha after Karni Sena filed a case on the actor and the director for hurting their sentiments and stated that the show "is an attempt to discredit Hinduism and Ashrams". In October 2021, the Bajrang Dal group targeted Aashram web series sets and Prakash Jha for defaming Hindus and the entire aashram system, through his web series, whereas the sets were vandalised by the group. Director Prakash Jha stated that "They will voice their concerns, but I think about the thousands who see my project in the correct manner. It is no joke that 1.5 billion people watched it. If we say there will be no objection, it is not right. " Later, Bobby Deol supported Jha and stated that the show is not about defaming anyone and as an actor nothing else matters.

Notes

References

External links 
 
 Aashram on MX Player

2020 web series debuts
Indian drama web series
MX Player original programming
Hinduism in pop culture-related controversies
Police procedural television series
Political thriller television series
Crime thriller web series
Superstitions of India
Works about race and ethnicity
2020s political television series
Serial drama television series
Indian drama television series
2020s Indian television series debuts
Indian crime drama television series
Indian mystery television series
Television series impacted by the COVID-19 pandemic
Works about the illegal drug trade
Works about Indian politics
Indian thriller television series
2020s crime drama television series
Works about human trafficking